Final Vinyl is a Hot Tuna compilation album. At the time the album was assembled, Jorma Kaukonen and Jack Casady had stopped performing together and were on to newer endeavours.  Kaukonen recorded a solo album, Jorma, and Casady joined the band SVT.  Kaukonen signed to RCA Records and Casady moved to 415 Records.  This marked the end of Hot Tuna on the Jefferson Airplane owned Grunt Records, so a "final" compilation album was assembled.  Kaukonen and Casady reunited to perform as Hot Tuna in 1983 and moved to the Relix Records label, where they released material until the late 1990s.

Critical reception

On AllMusic, Lindsay Planer wrote, "Issued in 1979, Final Vinyl gathers ten tracks from Hot Tuna's first eight LPs. While the tune stack is packed with enthusiast favorites, there are notable omissions and even a few questionable inclusions... Inclined parties are best served by the two-CD Best of Hot Tuna (1998), which contains a much broader and more accurate collection from the same era."

Track listing

Personnel
Jorma Kaukonen – guitars, vocals
Jack Casady – bass
Will Scarlett – harmonica on "Hesitation Blues" and "Candy Man"
Sammy Piazza – drums on "Candy Man", "Keep On Truckin'", "Water Song", "Day to Day Out the Window Blues" and "Easy Now"
Papa John Creach – violin on "Candy Man", "Keep On Truckin'" and "Water Song"
Nick Buck – keyboards on "Keep On Truckin'", "Water Song" and "I Wish You Would"
Bob Steeler – drums on "Funky #7", "Hot Jelly Roll Blues", "Song from the Stainless Cymbal" and "I Wish You Would"

Production
Pat Ieraci (Maurice) – production coordinator
Bill Thompson – manager
Tim Bryant / Gribbitt – art direction
Tim Bryant & George Corsillo / Gribbitt – design
Jacky Kaukonen and Pat Ieraci (Maurice) – album title
Mastered by John Golden, Kendun Recorders, Burbank
Roger Ressmeyer – photography

References

1979 greatest hits albums
Hot Tuna compilation albums
Grunt Records compilation albums